Seymours House is a heritage-listed residence and now offices at 24 Bosworth Street, Richmond, City of Hawkesbury, New South Wales, Australia. It was added to the New South Wales State Heritage Register on 2 April 1999.

History 

Seymours House was built  1840s. It is named after a family who had owned the property. Prior to the 1970s, the house was converted into flats and stripped of many original details, but was subsequently significantly restored. It has now been converted to commercial offices.

Description

Seymours House is a late Georgian stuccoed brick townhouse, five bays wide, and originally covered by a bellcast iron verandah roof. It features shuttered twelve paned windows and an original central front door with elegant sidelights and fanlight. A slate hipped roof and service wing extend at right angles to the rear.

Heritage listing 

Seymours House was listed on the New South Wales State Heritage Register on 2 April 1999.

See also

References

Bibliography

Attribution 
 
 

New South Wales State Heritage Register
Richmond, New South Wales
Houses in New South Wales
Articles incorporating text from the New South Wales State Heritage Register